Sara Powell Haardt (March 1, 1898 – May 31, 1935) was an American author and professor of English literature. Though she died at the age of 37 of meningitis, she produced a considerable body of work including newspaper reviews, articles, essays, a novel The Making of a Lady, several screenplays and over 50 short stories.  She is central to John Barton Wolgamot's notorious book-length poem, In Sara Mencken, Christ and Beethoven there were men and women (1944), recorded by the composer Robert Ashley.

Early life and education 
Sara Powell Haardt was born March 1, 1898, to Venetia (Hall) Haardt and German American John Anton Haardt in Montgomery, Alabama, the eldest of five children. She attended the Margaret Booth School. In 1920, she graduated Phi Beta Kappa from Goucher College in Baltimore, Maryland. While still an undergraduate at Goucher, she had become a professional writer, writing for literary reviews and popular periodicals.

Career 
She was immediately hired to teach at Goucher College in the English Department upon graduation.

She became the head of the Alabama branch of the National Woman's Party, where she led the unsuccessful fight to have the Alabama Legislature ratify the 19th Amendment.

In 1923, she met fellow Baltimore writer H. L. Mencken. Despite his widely known opposition to the institution of marriage, and his criticism of suffragettes, they married in 1930.

Death 
She died in 1935 from meningitis.
Her death was the result of complications of tuberculosis, from which she had suffered for many years.

Recognition
Her short story "Absolutely Perfect" won her a nomination for the O. Henry Prize in 1933.

References

Sources

External links
Sara Haardt Mencken Collection at Goucher College
Mapping Hidden Collections – The H.L. and Sara Haardt Mencken Collection at Goucher College
Encyclopedia of Alabama – Sara Haardt Mencken
Findagrave.com – Sara Haardt Mencken

1898 births
1935 deaths
American academics of English literature
Goucher College alumni
American women novelists
20th-century American novelists
Writers from Montgomery, Alabama
Goucher College faculty and staff
American women short story writers
20th-century American short story writers
20th-century deaths from tuberculosis
20th-century American women writers
American people of German descent
Novelists from Maryland
Novelists from Alabama
American women non-fiction writers
Tuberculosis deaths in Maryland
Infectious disease deaths in Maryland
Neurological disease deaths in Maryland
Deaths from meningitis
American women academics
H. L. Mencken